The Schermützelsee is a lake in Brandenburg, Germany. With its surface area of 1.37 km² it is the largest water in the hill country „Märkische Schweiz“ and in the Märkische Schweiz Nature Park. 

At an elevation of 26,5 m, its depth is maximal 38 m. The lake is fed by the Sophienfließ and groundwater. An approximately 7,5 kilometres long walking path leads around the Schermützelsee. At the northeastern shore there is situated the „Strandbad Buckow“, a public lido/beach with a diving tower, beach café and rowboat rental; it was opened in 1911. On the sea the passenger ship „MS Scherri“ is in operation since 1992, which was built in 1879 by the Reiherstiegwerft in Hamburg. First named „Reiher“ the ship started up 1879 on the Alster. 

At the eastern shore is located the listed „Brecht-Weigel-Haus“. Bertolt Brecht and the actress Helene Weigel were working in the summerhouse since 1952 (and Weigel alone after the death of Brecht in 1956). Since 1977 the house is used as museum and memorial to the artist couple. Listed is the whole ensemble, including some buildings as well as the garden with sculptures, sea-balustrade, water tower, boathouse and landing stage.

External links

Lakes of Brandenburg
Märkisch-Oderland